Jules Bouquet (30 November 1888 – 30 October 1955) was a French wrestler. He competed at the 1920 and 1924 Summer Olympics. He also won seven national championships.

References

External links
 

1888 births
1955 deaths
Olympic wrestlers of France
Wrestlers at the 1920 Summer Olympics
Wrestlers at the 1924 Summer Olympics
French male sport wrestlers
Sportspeople  from Moulins, Allier